Jonath is both a given name and surname. Notable people with the name include:

Jonatus (d. c. 690), abbot
Arthur Jonath (1909–1963), German sprinter
Johnath Marlone Azevedo da Silva (born 1992), Brazilian footballer